Beat Saber is a virtual reality rhythm game developed and published by Czech game developer Beat Games. It takes place in a surrealistic neon environment and features the player slicing blocks representing musical beats with a pair of contrasting-colored sabers. Following an early access release in November 2018, the game was officially released for PlayStation 4 and Windows on May 21, 2019, and supports most virtual reality headsets including HTC Vive, Oculus Quest, Quest 2 and Quest Pro, PlayStation VR, and Valve Index. The game is also scheduled to become available on the PlayStation 5 with PlayStation VR2 support.

Gameplay 

The player uses VR motion controllers to wield a pair of glowing sabers, which by default are colored red and blue for left and right respectively. In each song, the game presents the player with a stream of approaching blocks laid out in sync with the song's beats and notes, located in one of the 12 possible positions of a 4x3 grid. Each one may also be marked with an arrow indicating one of eight possible directions in which the block may be required to be cut through. There are also blocks with dots instead of arrows, which players may hit in any direction. When a block is properly cut by a saber, it is destroyed and a score is awarded, based on the length and angle of the swing and the accuracy of the cut. 

In addition, there are occasionally bombs that the player should not hit, and obstacles in the form of oncoming walls that the player's head should avoid. Underneath the path where the blocks travel is a white bar that slowly fills up as the player hits notes correctly. If the player hits any note in the incorrect direction, this 'energy bar' will decrease by a small bit. If the player completely misses a note, the bar will lose a larger amount. If the bar becomes completely empty, the level will end.

Since the addition of Original Soundtrack (OST) 5, two new mechanics were introduced to the game. One new mechanic features a new block called a Chain, which starts with a "slice" which indicates which direction to cut. After the lead slice, there are a number of smaller "slices" which can be cut. The other new mechanic is the arc. An arc is a line showing the recommended path for your saber to follow. It is connected to a block and continues on until it either connects to another block or stops altogether. Both of these new mechanics also calculate score differently than the original blocks.

Since its early access stages, the game included a single-player mode as well as a party mode, which features a leaderboard with the player's names, which are entered after each song is played. Additionally, the game includes a level editor and a practice mode that allows the player to alter the song's speed, or start playing it from any point in time, and not just the beginning. The game added a multiplayer mode in which anywhere from two to five players can play a level together, with the person with the highest score winning. In multiplayer mode, the game awards the player with badges based on performance. These are: Longest journey, Casual cutter, Saber surgeon, Lumberjack, Jazz hands, Fencer, Restless slicer, Nihilist, No mercy, and Air slicer. 

Beat Saber shipped with ten songs, but has been expanded with several downloadable content packs and updates which include new songs. Several of these include original songs, but several packages are licensed songs featuring music and special stages from bands such as Imagine Dragons, Panic! at the Disco, Green Day, Linkin Park, BTS, Lady Gaga, and musicians signed to Interscope Records. In addition, the community has created modifications for Beat Saber, allowing custom songs and maps. Each song has five levels of difficulty: Easy, Normal, Hard, Expert, and the hardest being Expert+.

Paid DLC

Development 
Beat Saber began after the completion of Beat Games' (Hyperbolic Magnetism at the time) previous title, Chameleon Run. Vladimír Hrinčár and Ján Ilavský began creating demos and prototypes, and some of these were posted on Facebook. The composer, Jaroslav Beck saw some of these prototypes and met the team in Prague in order to convince them to let him create the soundtrack for the game. After around two years of development, the game was released in early access on May 1, 2018.

Release

The game was first released in early access on Windows on May 1, 2018. The game was released on PlayStation 4 on November 20, 2018. An editor was announced for release in May 2018, which would allow for the creation of custom user songs, but it was postponed, and added in May 2019.

In March 2019, Beat Games released its first paid song pack, featuring 10 songs from electronic music record label Monstercat. "Crab Rave" was added as a free update on April Fools' day that year. On May 2, 2019, to celebrate the game's first anniversary, a prototype version created three years prior was released to the public as Beat Saber Origins. The game was fully released out of early access on PC on May 21, 2019. On January 29, 2020, the game received a free pack featuring three songs by Japanese artist Camellia.

Facebook via Oculus Studios acquired Beat Games in November 2019. The company stated that the purchase would not affect future development of Beat Saber on third-party VR platforms besides Oculus. Beat Games will continue to operate in Prague as an independent studio, although under the umbrella of Oculus Studios. The studio released the new 360-degree levels on December 14, 2019.

Reception 

During its early access phase, Beat Saber received numerous positive reviews, becoming the highest rated game on Steam less than a week after its early access release. The game sold over a million copies by March 2019. By February 2021, the game has sold over 4 million copies and 40 million songs have been sold through paid DLC.

Edge thought the game was an excellent fit for VR as a medium, writing "At this point in virtual reality's development, it's still rare to encounter a game that feels native to the technology. Beat Saber is an exception."
IGN noted that while the game "doesn't push the limits of [VR tech] too far", the game is extremely effective at communicating the appeal of VR, and considered the game "a go-to for introducing anyone to virtual reality."
GameSpot noted that at launch the supported song library was "slim", but nevertheless concluded that "Beat Saber is an exhilarating rush and an exhausting game to play in the best way."

Beat Saber has grown a strong following since its debut, and users have created numerous mods to enhance the game. Also, a number of websites have surfaced, where users distribute beat maps they created themselves, some of them even allowing for this content to be sideloaded onto the Oculus Quest. There are even sites that allow for AI-generated maps automatically, like bsmapper or beatsage.

Awards

References

External links 
 

2019 video games
Virtual reality games
Indie video games
Dance video games
Single-player video games
Video games developed in the Czech Republic
HTC Vive games
Oculus Rift games
Meta Quest games
Valve Index games
PlayStation 4 games
PlayStation VR games
Windows games
Early access video games
Interactive Achievement Award winners
The Game Awards winners
Golden Joystick Award winners